Port del Comte is a ski resort in located in the Port del Comte mountain range, in the pre-Pyrenees, at the north of the Serra de Querol, in Catalonia, Spain. The ski area has a summit elevation of 2400 m (7874 ft.) above sea level and a base of 1700 m (5577 ft.) with a vertical drop of 700 m (2297 ft.). 

The resort is divided into two sectors: the first includes the Querol and north of Serrat de la Bòfia. It has all of the service centers and parking, as well as the lifts with greater capacity. Three chairlifts have been recently added, as well as snowmaking on some of the runs. The other sector is located in an area between the highest Pedró dels Quatre Batlles and Estivella.  It has no road access: access is by a double chairlift from a south-southwest  orientation of the runs, which often suffer from lack of snowpack. This area of the resort, which lacks snowmaking, is often closed when the other areas are open.

External links
portdelcomte.net - official site

Ski areas and resorts in Catalonia